The Kings County Record is a weekly newspaper serving Sussex, New Brunswick and the surrounding area. It began publication in 1887. It is the paper of record in Kings County, New Brunswick and is published on Tuesdays.

See also
List of newspapers in Canada

Notes

External links
 Profile from Industry Canada

Weekly newspapers published in New Brunswick
Buildings and structures in Kings County, New Brunswick
Publications established in 1887
1887 establishments in New Brunswick